Paul Reed Smith Guitars, also known as PRS Guitars, is an American guitar and amplifier manufacturer located in Stevensville, Maryland. The company was founded in 1985 in Annapolis, Maryland by Paul Reed Smith. 

Products manufactured by PRS include electric & acoustic guitars, basses, and amplifiers.

History

Beginning: 1985-1995 

Paul Reed Smith set up a partnership to create a factory in Annapolis, Maryland. and set off work on producing guitars. The company's first outing was for the 1985 NAMM Show where they debuted the PRS Custom. Featuring a mahogany neck set into a mahogany body with a maple cap, a patented vibrato, customized tuning pegs, and custom rotary pickup switching with high quality electronics, the guitar represented influences from both old and new; something striking in the midst of an industry that was producing "high tech" guitars. "I saw Adrian Belew on King Crimson's Beat tour in 1982," says Smith, "and the sound he was getting out of his guitar was on another planet somewhere. He let me rebuild his Ibanez Blazer. I put in our whole tuning-peg/bridge system and a new electronic system with an Alembic Stratoblaster pre-amp. It sounded unbelievable. Right then I decided that I wanted to put those sounds on a humbucking guitar, which is when I went back to the rotary switch and redesigned it for humbuckers." After three years, the company employed 45 people, and was producing 15 guitars per day.

Construction

Hardware 
Nuts are synthetic and tuners are of PRS's own design, although some models feature Korean-made Kluson-style tuners. PRS guitars feature three original bridge designs: a one-piece pre-intonated stoptail, a vibrato, and a wrapover tailpiece. The vibrato was designed with the help of guitar engineer John Mann. It was an update on the classic Fender vibrato and used cam-locking tuners, which offered wide pitch bending with exceptional tuning stability.

Pickups 

Pickups are designed and wound in-house. While most of the pickups are humbuckers, some are actually a pair of single coils wound in opposing directions, one intended for the neck and one for the bridge position. Through the use of a unique rotary pickup selector switch, PRS pickups offer 5 different sounds: a combination of thick humbucking Gibson-like tones, and chimey single-coil Stratocaster-like tones. The standard treble and standard bass pick ups use magnetic pole pieces in the non-adjustable inner coil, and a rear-placed feeder magnet in order to achieve a more authentic single-coil tone when split by the rotary switch.

PRS developed pickups for the aggressive rock market, offering pick ups such as the chainsaw, and the Hot-Fat-Screams (HFS) initially used on the Special model.

In 1998, an electronic upgrade kit was released for pre-1993 instruments which included lighter-weight tuner buttons, nickel-plated brass screws for saddles and intonation, a simulated tone control, and high-capacitance hookup wire. In 2012, PRS released the 408 pickups used on the 408 and Paul's Guitar models. These pickups include innovations that feature no loss of volume when in coil split mode. They have an exclusive agreement to use wire drawn from the same machine that made wire for Les Paul and Stratocaster pickups in the 1950s.

Certain models of PRS Guitars have also used pickups by Lindy Fralin, notably in the EG II and certain specs of the Custom 22.

Models 

In 1985, Paul Reed Smith started producing factory made guitars, which later became known as PRS Standard.

In 1988, Paul Reed Smith introduced its more affordable Bolt-On series known as classic electric (CE models) which were discontinued in 2009. In 2016, the CE line was put back in production.

In 1990, PRS EG was introduced as company's first 22-fret guitar. Later on in the more successful 1992 PRS EG II was introduced, which includes PRS's first left-handed guitar.

In 1992, PRS introduced the Dragon 1 model. Only 50 units were produced. It featured an intricate dragon inlay which ran down the finger board, a wide 22 fret neck, a non-vibrato Stop-tail bridge, and a new pick up design. The changes in design from previous models added a noticeable tonal improvement which led the company to use the same characteristics in later models such as the PRS Custom 22. The Dragon 2 was released in 1993, and the Dragon 3 in 1994. Both featured dragon inlays which became more extreme with every year. Only 100 of each of the 2 models were made. In 1999, PRS released the Dragon 2000, which featured complex body curves, and a 3 dimensional dragon inlay. Just 50 Dragon 2000's were ever produced.

In 1994, Paul Reed Smith collaborated with Ted McCarty and launched the "McCarty" Series. The McCarty series offers a more vintage feeling and sounding PRS Guitar.

PRS introduced a more affordable line of guitars in 2000 referred to as the "SE" which are manufactured in Korea by World Musical Instrument Co. Ltd. for the electrics and Wildwood for the acoustics. PRS produces a large range of models in the SE series including the Custom 24, SE245, SE Kestrel and Kingfisher bass guitars as well as signature guitars such as the Bernie Marsden, Mark Tremonti, Zach Myers and Carlos Santana amongst others. They also intro their Singlecut models in 2001.

PRS introduces a range of amplifiers and acoustic guitars in 2009.

In 2013, PRS added the S2 Series and in February 2018 PRS began producing a Silver Sky model based on two of John Mayer's favourite guitars from the 1960s.

In 2019, PRS announced three SE signature models: PRS SE Santana Singlecut Trem, PRS SE Paul's Guitar, and PRS SE Schizoid.

In 2022, PRS announced the PRS SE Silver Sky, the SE model of the John Mayer Signature Silver Sky.

Legal challenge
In 2001, PRS released their Singlecut model, which resembled the traditional Les Paul guitar. Gibson Guitar Corporation filed a trademark infringement lawsuit against the owner, Paul Reed Smith. An injunction was ordered that required PRS to stop manufacturing of the Singlecut at the end of 2004. Federal District Court Judge William J. Haynes, then ruled the Singlecut was an imitation of the Gibson Les Paul. However, in 2005, the United States Court of Appeals for the Sixth Circuit reversed the lower court decision and ordered the dismissal of Gibson's suit and PRS resumed production.

While no changes to the design of the Singlecut occurred as a result of the lawsuit, some Singlecut owners and sellers have adopted the term 'pre-lawsuit' to differentiate their Singlecut guitar from others.

References

External links

 
 Paul Reed Smith Interview NAMM Oral History Library (2013)

Guitar manufacturing companies of the United States
Guitar amplifier manufacturers
Manufacturing companies based in Maryland
Queen Anne's County, Maryland
Manufacturing companies established in 1985
Kent Island, Maryland
1985 establishments in Maryland
American companies established in 1985